Orlando Requeijo Gual was the Permanent Representative of Cuba to the United Nations from 2004 to 2006.

References
 Granma; Proposal for human rights council favors major powers; April 13, 2005

Cuban diplomats
Permanent Representatives of Cuba to the United Nations
Year of birth missing (living people)
Living people
Communist Party of Cuba politicians
2000s in Cuba
21st-century Cuban politicians